Collège Français can refer to:

Schools
Collège Français (Longueuil), a private French-language secondary school and primary school in Longueuil, Quebec, Canada
Collège Français (Montreal), a private French-language secondary school in Montreal, Quebec, Canada
Le Collège français, a public French-language high school in Toronto, Ontario, Canada

Sports teams
Longueuil Collège Français, Quebec Junior AAA Hockey League based in Longueuil, Quebec, Canada
Longueuil Collège Français (QMJHL), defunct Quebec Major Junior Hockey League team that 1989 to 1991
Verdun Collège Français, Quebec Major Junior Hockey League team based in Verdun, Montreal, Quebec, Canada